The GeForce 6 series (codename NV40) is Nvidia's sixth generation of GeForce graphic processing units. Launched on April 14, 2004, the GeForce 6 family introduced PureVideo post-processing for video, SLI technology, and Shader Model 3.0 support (compliant with Microsoft DirectX 9.0c specification and OpenGL 2.0).

GeForce 6 series features

SLI

The Scalable Link Interface (SLI) allows two GeForce 6 cards of the same type to be connected in tandem. The driver software balances the workload between the cards. SLI-capability is limited to select members of the GeForce 6 family; 6500 and above. SLI is only available for cards utilizing the PCI-Express bus.

Nvidia PureVideo Technology

Nvidia PureVideo technology is the combination of a dedicated video processing core and software which decodes H.264, VC-1, WMV, and MPEG-2 videos with reduced CPU utilization.

Shader Model 3.0
Nvidia was the first to deliver Shader Model 3.0 (SM3) capability in its GPUs. SM3 extends SM2 in a number of ways: standard FP32 (32-bit floating-point) precision, dynamic branching, increased efficiency and longer shader lengths are the main additions. Shader Model 3.0 was quickly adopted by game developers because it was quite simple to convert existing shaders coded with SM 2.0/2.0A/2.0B to version 3.0, and it offered noticeable performance improvements across the entire GeForce 6 line.

Caveats
PureVideo functionality varies by model, with some models lacking WMV9 and/or H.264 acceleration.

In addition, motherboards with some VIA and SIS chipsets and an AMD Athlon XP processor seemingly have compatibility problems with the GeForce 6600 and 6800 GPUs. Problems that have been known to arise are freezing, artifacts, reboots, and other issues that make gaming and use of 3D applications almost impossible. These problems seem to happen only on Direct3D based applications and do not affect OpenGL.

Geforce 6 series comparison

Here is how the released versions of the "GeForce 6" series family compare to Nvidia's previous flagship GPU, the GeForce FX 5950 Ultra, in addition to the comparable units of ATI's newly released for the time Radeon X800 and X850 series:

(*) GeForce FX series has an Array-based Vertex Shader.

(**) AGP 6600 GT variant.

GeForce 6800 series

The first family in the GeForce 6 product-line, the 6800 series catered to the high-performance gaming market. As the very first GeForce 6 model, the 16 pixel pipeline GeForce 6800 Ultra (NV40) was 2 to 2.5 times faster than Nvidia's previous top-line product (the GeForce FX 5950 Ultra), packed four times the number of pixel pipelines, twice the number of texture units and added a much improved pixel-shader architecture. Yet, the 6800 Ultra was fabricated on the same (IBM) 130 nanometer process node as the FX 5950, and it consumed slightly less power.

Like all of Nvidia's GPUs up until 2004, initial 6800 members were designed for the AGP bus. Nvidia added support for the PCI Express (PCIe) bus in later GeForce 6 products, usually by use of an AGP-PCIe bridge chip. In the case of the 6800 GT and 6800 Ultra, Nvidia developed a variant of the NV40 chip called the NV45. The NV45 shares the same die core as the NV40, but embeds an AGP-PCIe bridge on the chip's package. (Internally, the NV45 is an AGP NV40 with added bus-translation logic, to permit interfacing with a PCIe motherboard. Externally, the NV45 is a single package with two separate silicon dies clearly visible on the top.) NV48 is a version of NV45 which supports 512MiB RAM.

The use of an AGP-PCIe bridge chip initially led to fears that natively-AGP GPUs would not be able to take advantage of the additional bandwidth offered by PCIe and would therefore be at a disadvantage relative to native PCIe chips. However, benchmarking reveals that even AGP 4× is fast enough that most contemporary games do not improve significantly in performance when switched to AGP 8×, rendering the further bandwidth increase provided by PCIe largely superfluous. Additionally, Nvidia's on-board implementations of AGP are clocked at AGP 12× or 16×, providing bandwidth comparable to PCIe for the rare situations when this bandwidth is actually necessary.

The use of a bridge chip allowed Nvidia to release a full complement of PCIe graphics cards without having to redesign them for the PCIe interface. Later, when Nvidia's GPUs were designed to use PCIe natively, the bidirectional bridge chip allowed them to be used in AGP cards.
ATI, initially a critic of the bridge chip, eventually designed a similar solution (known as Rialto) for their own cards.

Nvidia's professional Quadro line contains members drawn from the 6800 series: Quadro FX 4000 (AGP) and the Quadro FX 3400, 4400 and 4400g (both PCI Express).  The 6800 series was also incorporated into laptops with the GeForce Go 6800 and Go 6800 Ultra GPUs.

PureVideo and the AGP GeForce 6800
PureVideo expanded the level of multimedia-video support from decoding of MPEG-2 video to decoding of more advanced codecs (MPEG-4, WMV9), enhanced post-processing (advanced de-interlacing), and limited acceleration for encoding. But perhaps ironically, the first GeForce product(s) to offer PureVideo, the AGP GeForce 6800/GT/Ultra, failed to support all of PureVideo's advertised features.

Media player software (WMP9) with support for WMV-acceleration did not become available until several months after the 6800's introduction. User and web reports showed little if any difference between PureVideo enabled GeForces and non-Purevideo cards. The prolonged public silence of Nvidia, after promising updated drivers, and test benchmarks gathered by users led the user community to conclude that the WMV9 decoder component of the AGP 6800's PureVideo unit is either non-functional or intentionally disabled. 

In late 2005, an update to Nvidia's website finally confirmed what had long been suspected by the user community: WMV-acceleration is not available on the AGP 6800. Of course, today's standard computers are fast enough to play WMV9 video and other sophisticated codecs like MPEG-4, H.264 or VP8 without hardware acceleration.

GeForce 6 series general features

4, 8, 12, or 16 pixel-pipeline GPU architecture
Up to 8x more shading performance compared to the previous generation
CineFX 3.0 engine - DirectX 9 Shader Model 3.0 support
On Chip Video processor (PureVideo)
Full MPEG-2 encoding and decoding at GPU level (PureVideo)
Advanced Adaptive De-Interlacing (PureVideo)
DDR and GDDR-3 memory on a 256-bit wide Memory interface
UltraShadow II technology - 3x to 4x faster than NV35 (GeForce FX 5900)
High Precision Dynamic Range (HPDR) technology
128-bit studio precision through the entire pipeline - Floating-point 32-bit color precision
IntelliSample 4.0 Technology - 16x Anisotropic Filtering, Rotating Grid Antialiasing and Transparency Antialiasing (see here)
Maximum display resolution of 2048x1536@85 Hz
Video Scaling and Filtering - HQ filtering techniques up to HDTV resolutions
Integrated TV Encoder - TV-output up to 1024x768 resolutions
OpenGL 2.0 Optimizations and support
DVC 3.0 (Digital Vibrance Control)
Dual 400 MHz RAMDACs which support QXGA displays up to 2048x1536 @ 85 Hz
Dual DVI outputs on select members (implementation depends on the card manufacturer)

6800 chipset table

Notes
The limited-supply GeForce 6800 Ultra Extreme Edition was shipped with a 450 MHz core clock and (usually) a 1200 MHz memory clock, but was otherwise identical to a common 6800 Ultra.
The GeForce 6800 GS is cheaper to manufacture and has a lower MSRP than the GeForce 6800 GT because it has fewer pipelines and is fabricated on a smaller process (110 vs 130 nm), but performance is similar because it has a faster core clock. The AGP version, however, uses the original NV40 chip and 6800 GT circuit board and the inactive pixel and vertex pipelines may potentially be unlockable. However, the PCI Express version lacks them entirely, preventing such modifications.
The 6800 GTO (which was produced only as an OEM card) contains four masked pixel pipelines and one masked vertex shader, which are potentially unlockable.
The GeForce 6800 is often unofficially called the "GeForce 6800 Vanilla" or the "GeForce 6800 NU" (for Non-Ultra) to distinguish it from the other models. Recent PCIe variants have the NV41 (IBM 0.13 micrometre) or NV42 (TSMC 0.11 micrometre) cores, which are native PCIe implementations and do not have an integrated AGP bridge chip. The AGP version of the video card contains four masked pixel pipelines and one masked vertex shader, which are potentially unlockable through software mods. PCI-Express 6800 cards are incapable of such modifications, because the masked pixel pipelines and vertex buffers are nonexistent.
The 6800 XT varies greatly depending on manufacturer. It is produced using three cores (NV40/NV41/NV42), four memory configurations (128 MiB DDR, 256 MiB DDR, 128 MiB GDDR3, 256 MiB GDDR3, and 512 MiB GDDR2), and has clock speeds ranging from 300 to 425 MHz (core) and 600-1000 MHz (memory). 6800 XT cards based on the NV40 core contain eight masked pixel pipelines and two masked vertex shaders, and those based on the NV42 core contain four masked pipelines and one masked shader (for some reason, the NV42 cards are almost never unlockable. It is speculated that the pipelines are being laser-cut).
The 6800 LE contains eight masked pixel pipelines and two masked vertex shaders, which are potentially unlockable.
The AGP version of the 6800 series does not have support for 2D acceleration in Adobe Reader/Acrobat 9.0 even though the GeForce AGP 6600, and PCI-e 6800 versions do.

GeForce 6600 series

The GeForce 6600 (NV43) was officially launched on August 12, 2004, several months after the launch of the 6800 Ultra. With half the pixel pipelines and vertex shaders of the 6800 GT, and a smaller 128-bit memory bus, the lower-performance and lower-cost 6600 is the mainstream product of the GeForce 6 series. The 6600 series retains the core rendering features of the 6800 series, including SLI. Equipped with fewer rendering units, the 6600 series processes pixel data at a slower rate than the more powerful 6800 series. However, the reduction in hardware resources, and migration to TSMC's 110 nm manufacturing process (versus the 6800's 130 nm process), make the 6600 both less expensive for Nvidia to manufacture and less expensive for customers to purchase.

Their 6600 series currently has three variants: the GeForce 6600LE, the 6600, and the 6600GT (in order from slowest to fastest.) The 6600 GT performs quite a bit better than the GeForce FX 5950 Ultra or Radeon 9800 XT, with the 6600 GT scoring around 8000 in 3DMark03, while the GeForce FX 5950 Ultra scored around 6000, and it is also much cheaper. Notably, the 6600 GT offered identical performance to ATI's high-end X800 PRO graphics card with drivers previous December 2004, when running the popular game Doom 3. It was also about as fast as the higher-end GeForce 6800 when running games without anti-aliasing in most scenarios.

At introduction, the 6600 family was only available in PCI Express form. AGP models became available roughly a month later, through the use of Nvidia's AGP-PCIe bridge chip. A majority of the AGP GeForce 6600GTs have their memory clocked at 900 MHz, which is 100 MHz slower than the PCI-e cards, on which the memory operates at 1000 MHz. This can contribute to a performance decline when playing certain games. However, it was often possible to "overclock" the memory to its nominal frequency of 1000 MHz and there are AGP cards (for example from XFX) that use 1000 MHz by default.

6600 chipset table

Other data for PCI Express based cards:

 Memory Interface: 128-bit
 Memory Bandwidth: 16.0 GiB/s.
 Fill Rate (pixels/s.): 4.0 billion
 Vertices per Second: 375 million
 Memory Data Rate: 1000 MHz
 Pixels per Clock (peak): 8
 RAMDACs: 400 MHz

Other data for AGP based cards:

 Memory Interface: 128-bit
 Memory Bandwidth: 14.4 GiB/s.
 Fill Rate (pixels/s.): 4.0 billion
 Vertices per Second: 375 million
 Memory Data Rate: 900 MHz
 Pixels per Clock (peak): 8
 RAMDACs 400 MHz

GeForce 6500
The GeForce 6500 was released in October 2005 and is based on the same NV44 core as the value/budget (low-end or entry level) GeForce 6200TC, but with a higher GPU clock speed and more memory. The GeForce 6500 also supports SLI.

GeForce 6500
 Core Clock: 450 MHz
 Memory Clock: 700 MHz
 Pixel Pipelines: 4
 Number of ROPs: 2
 Vertex Processors: 3
 Memory: 128/256 MiB DDR on a 64-bit interface
 Fill Rate (pixels/s): 1.6 billion
 Vertices per Second: 300 million
 Effective Memory Bandwidth (GiB/s): 13.44

GeForce 6200

With just 4 pixel pipelines, the 6200 series forms Nvidia's value/budget (low-end or entry level) product. The 6200 omits memory compression and SLI support, but otherwise offers similar rendering features as the 6600s. The later 6200 boards were based on the NV44 core (s), which is the final production silicon for the 6200 series. It is also the only card in the series to feature keying for 3.3V AGP slots (barring some rare exceptions of higher-end cards from vendors like PNY).

However, at introduction, production silicon was not yet ready. Nvidia fulfilled 6200 orders by shipping binned/rejected 6600 series cores (NV43V). The rejects were factory-modified to disable four  pixel pipelines, thereby converting the native 6600 product into a 6200 product. Some users were able to "unlock" early 6200 boards through a software utility (effectively converting the 6200 back into a 6600 with the complete set of eight pixel pipelines total) if they owned boards with an NV43 A2 or earlier revision of the core. Thus, not all NV43-based 6200 boards could successfully be unlocked (specifically, those with a core revision of A4 or higher), and as soon as NV44 production silicon became available, Nvidia discontinued shipments of downgraded NV43V cores.

GeForce 6200 chip specifications

GeForce 6200
Core Clock: 300 MHz
Memory Clock: 550 MHz
Pixel Pipelines: 4
Vertex Processors: 3
Memory: 128/256/512 MiB DDR on a 64-bit/128-bit interface

GeForce 6200 TurboCache / AGP
The GeForce 6200 TurboCache / AGP (NV44/NV44a) is a natively four-pipeline version of the NV43. GeForce 6200 TurboCache cards only have a very small (by modern standards) amount of memory, but attempt to make up for this by using system memory accessed through the PCI-Express bus.

GeForce 6200 TurboCache / AGP chip specifications

GeForce 6200 PCI-Express (NV44) TurboCache
 Core Clock: 350 MHz
 Memory Clock: 700 MHz
 Pixel Pipelines: 4
 Number of ROPs: 2
 Vertex Processors: 3
 Memory: 16/32/64/128 MiB DDR on a 32-bit/64-bit/128-bit interface
GeForce 6200 w/ TurboCache supporting 128 MiB, including 16 MiB of local TurboCache (32-bit)
GeForce 6200 w/ TurboCache supporting 128 MiB, including 32 MiB of local TurboCache (64-bit)
GeForce 6200 w/ TurboCache supporting 256 MiB, including 64 MiB of local TurboCache (64-bit)
GeForce 6200 w/ TurboCache supporting 256 MiB, including 128 MiB of local TurboCache (128-bit)

GeForce 6200 AGP (NV44a) without TurboCache
 Core Clock: 350 MHz
 Memory Clock: 500 MHz
 Pixel Pipelines: 4
 Number of ROPs: 2
 Vertex Processors: 3
 Memory: 128/256/512 MiB DDR or DDR2 on a 64-bit interface

GeForce 6200 AGP (NV44a2) without TurboCache
 Core Clock: 350 MHz
 Memory Clock: 540 MHz
 Pixel Pipelines: 4
 Number of ROPs: 2
 Vertex Processors: 3
 Memory: 128/256 MiB DDR2 with a 128-bit interface
 Cooling: Passive heatsink

GeForce 6200 PCI (NV44) without TurboCache
BFG Technologies originally introduced a unique PCI variant of the GeForce 6200 via its namesake B.F.G. and 3D Fuzion product lines. Subsequently, PNY (GeForce 6200 256 MiB PCI), SPARKLE Computer (GeForce 6200 128 MiB PCI and GeForce 6200 256 MiB PCI), and eVGA (e-GeForce 6200 256 MiB PCI) released their own PCI versions of the Geforce 6200 featuring higher memory clocks and resultant memory bandwidth.

Until the release of the ATI X1300 PCI, these were the only PCI DirectX 9 capable cards not based on previous generation GeForce5 FX technology or discontinued XGI Technology Volari V3XT chipsets.

Excluding SPARKLE's GeForce 8400 and 8500 series, Zotac GT 610 cards and Club 3D HD 5450, in late 2012 the enhanced 512 MiB Geforce 6200 PCI variants remain among the most powerful PCI based systems available, making these cards desired by users lacking the option of upgrading to an AGP or PCI Express based discrete video card.

 Core Clock: 350 MHz
 Memory Clock: 400 MHz (BFG Technologies 6200 OC 410 MHz, PNY and EVGA 533 MHz)
 Pixel Pipelines: 4
 Memory: 256 (BFG Technologies 6200 OC PCI and EVGA e-Ge-Force 6200 PCI) / 128 (BFG Technologies 3DFuzion GeForce 6200 PCI) MiB DDR on a 64-bit interface

GeForce 6100 and 6150 series

In late 2005 Nvidia introduced a new member to the GeForce family, the 6100 series, also known as C51. The term GeForce 6100/6150 actually refers to an nForce4-based motherboard with an integrated NV44 core, as opposed to a standalone graphics card. Nvidia released this product both to follow up its immensely popular GeForce4 MX based nForce and nForce2 boards and to compete with ATI's RS480/482 and Intel's GMA 900/950 in the integrated graphics space. The 6100 series is very competitive, usually tying with or just edging out the ATI products in most benchmarks.

The motherboards use two different types of southbridges - the nForce 410 and the nForce 430. They are fairly similar in features to the nForce4 Ultra motherboards that were on the market before them. Both feature PCI Express and PCI support, eight USB 2.0 ports, integrated sound, two Parallel ATA ports, and Serial ATA 3.0 Gibit/s with Native Command Queuing (NCQ) – two SATA ports in the case of the 410, four in the 430. The 430 southbridge also supports Gigabit Ethernet with Nvidia's ActiveArmor hardware firewall, while the 410 supports standard 10/100 Ethernet only.

GeForce 6100 and 6150 series chip specifications
Both the 6100 and 6150 support Shader Model 3.0 and DirectX 9.0c. The 6150 also features support for High-Definition video decoding of H.264/VC1/MPEG2, PureVideo Processing, DVI, and video-out. The 6100 only supports SD decoding of MPEG2/WMV9. Maximum supported resolution is 1920 × 1440 pixels (@75 Hz) for RGB display and 1600 × 1200 pixels (@65 Hz) for DVI-D display

GeForce 61XX abnormally high failure rate in notebook computers
In 2008, Nvidia took a $150 to 250M charge against revenue because the GPUs were failing at "higher than normal rates." HP provided an extension to their warranty of up to 24 months for notebooks affected by this issue. A class action suit was filed against HP and Nvidia by Whatley Drake & Kallas LLC.

GeForce 6100
 Manufacturing process: 90 nm
 Core Clock: 425 MHz
 Vertex Processors: 1
 Pixel Pipelines: 2
 Shader Model: 3
 DirectX support: v9.0c
 Video playback acceleration: SD video acceleration of MPEG2/WMV9 (HD video acceleration not supported)
 Outputs: VGA only
 Memory: Shared DDR/DDR2 (socket 754/939/AM2) system memory (selectable through BIOS - usually 16/32/64/128/256 MiB)

GeForce 6150
 Manufacturing process: 90 nm
 Core clock: 475 MHz
 Vertex processors: 1
 Pixel pipelines: 2
 Shader model: 3
 DirectX support: v9.0c
 Video playback acceleration: HD video acceleration of H.264/VC1/MPEG2
 Outputs: VGA, DVI, RCA (Video)
 Memory: Shared DDR2 (socket 939/AM2) system memory (selectable through BIOS - usually 16/32/64/128/256 MiB)
 HT Bus (Bandwidth) = 2000 MT/s max

GeForce 6150LE
The GeForce 6150LE was primarily featured in the 2006 lineup of the Nvidia Business Platform. The chip is used by Fujitsu-Siemens in its Esprimo green desktop, HP in its Pavilion Media Center a1547c Desktop PC and Compaq Presario SR1915 Desktop, and Dell in its Dimension C521 and E521 desktop PCs.

GeForce 6150SE
GeForce 6150SE (MCP61, also known as C61) is an updated, single-chip version of the Nvidia GeForce 6100. The MCP61 uses less power than the original C51 2-chip version of 6100. Its onboard video outperforms the 6150 in many 3D benchmarks despite its lower core frequency (425 MHz), because of added hardware Z-culling.

MCP61 introduced a bug in the SATA NCQ implementation. As a result, Nvidia employees have contributed code to disable NCQ operations under Linux.
Manufacturing process: 90 nm
Core Clock: 425 MHz
HT Bus = 2000 MT/s max
Vertex Processors: 1
Pixel Pipelines: 2
Shader Model: 3
DirectX support: v9.0c
Outputs: VGA only

IntelliSample 4.0 and the GeForce 6 GPUs
Upon launch of the GeForce 7 family of graphics processing units, IntelliSample 4.0 was considered to be an exclusive feature of the GeForce 7 series of GPUs. However, version 91.47 (and subsequent versions) of the Nvidia ForceWare drivers enable the features of IntelliSample 4.0 on the GeForce 6 GPUs. IntelliSample 4.0 introduces two new antialiasing modes, known as Transparency Supersampling Antialiasing and Transparency Multisampling Antialiasing. These new antialiasing modes enhance the image quality of thin-lined objects such as fences, trees, vegetation and grass in various games.

One possible reason for the enabling of IntelliSample 4.0 for GeForce 6 GPUs might be the fact that the GeForce 7100 GS GPUs are based on NV44 chips, the same as the GeForce 6200 models. Because of this, Nvidia had to backport IntelliSample 4.0 features to the NV4x GPUs, and as a result, the entire GeForce 6 family is able to enjoy the benefits of Transparency Antialiasing.

It was already well known across various communities that Transparency Antialiasing could be used on GeForce 6 GPUs by using some third party tweak tools. As of Nvidia ForceWare drivers 175.16, GeForce 6 IntelliSample 4.0 support has been removed.

Discontinued support 
Nvidia has ceased driver support for GeForce 6 series. The GeForce 6 series is the last to support the Windows 9x family of operating systems, as well as Windows NT 4.0. The successor GeForce 7 series only supports Windows 2000 and later (the Windows 8 drivers also support Windows 10).

 Windows XP 32-bit and Media Center Edition: 307.83 released on February 25, 2013
 Windows XP 64-bit: 307.83 released on February 25, 2013
 Windows Vista, 7 and 8 32-bit: 309.08 released on February 24, 2015
 Windows Vista, 7 and 8 64-bit: 309.08 released on February 24, 2015
 Windows 2000: 94.24 released on May 17, 2006
 Windows 98/ME: 81.98 released on December 21, 2005
Windows NT 4.0: 77.72 released on June 22, 2005
 Windows 95: 66.94 released on December 16, 2004

See also 

 Comparison of Nvidia graphics processing units
Curie (microarchitecture)
 GeForce FX series
 GeForce 7 series
 Scalable Link Interface

Notes and references

External links
 Nvidia: GeForce 6 Series Product Overview
 Nvidia PureVideo Technology page
 Inside nVidia NV40
 Transparency Antialiasing on GeForce 6 GPUs
 Nvidia: Integrated GPU Technical Specifications
 techPowerUp! GPU Database

Reviews
 nvNews/ a nvnews review of the GeForce 6800
 Beyond 3D/ preview of nv45 core architecture
 Guru3D Nvidia GeForce 6 Series and ATi X Series/comparison - 6-series v. Radeon X-series
 X-bit Labs Second Generation of Integrated Graphics from Nvidia: GeForce 6150 and GeForce 6100/ Page on GeForce 6100, 6150
 GeForce 6600GT review/ review- GeForce 6600GT

Computer-related introductions in 2004
6 Series
Graphics cards